Giovanni Battista Loreti  (1686 in Fano – 13 December 1760, in Fabriano)  was an Italian painter of the late Baroque period, active mainly in Fabriano.

Life
Born in Fano, his first years were in Fabriano, he soon moved to Rome, where he trained under Carlo Cignani. Moving back to Fabriano, he painted in a number of churches there and in San Severino Marche. His children, David (1708-1768), Eugenio (1725-1762), and Rosalba (died 1762), were also artists. Rosalba married Nicolò Miliani and of their sons, Michelangelo and Pietro Miliano also became artists.

References

1686 births
1760 deaths
People from Fano
Italian male painters
18th-century Italian painters
Italian Baroque painters
18th-century Italian male artists